Carnival of Souls is an original novel based on the U.S. television series Buffy the Vampire Slayer.

Plot summary

A traveling carnival arrives in Sunnydale. It seems the carnival might be another victim of Sunnydale's weirdness. Nobody seems to be able to remember it arriving despite the many old-style wagons, the numerous performers, and horse-drawn carts. The creepy calliope music seems almost to beckon out to people. Also nobody who goes into Hall of Mirrors comes out exactly the same as they were to start with. Inspired by a pair of once-homely twins now parading around the school like divas, the Scoobs decide to investigate the carnival. It's soon clear that entering comes at a cost above the price of admission. Willow becomes consumed by envy, Cordelia gets greedy, and Xander finds himself overtaken with gluttony. Angel is revealing a dangerous new persona, whilst anger rises in Rupert Giles. More serious still, Buffy's pride starts to threaten those she cares about.

Continuity

This story takes place in the second season of Buffy the Vampire Slayer, after Spike and Drusilla have arrived in Sunnydale but before Angel has lost his soul. However, there are numerous hints and mentions of things which occur in later seasons, including:
Clem (from season six) is mentioned as one of Angel's sources of information.

Canonical issues
 
    
Buffy novels, such as this one are considered by most fans to not be part of Buffyverse canon. They are not considered as official Buffyverse reality, but are novels from the authors' imaginations. However unlike fanfic, 'overviews' summarising their story, written early in the writing process, were 'approved' by both Fox and Whedon (or his office), and the books were therefore later published as official Buffy merchandise.

External links
Carnival of Souls at Google Books
Whedonesque.com - Whedonesquers discuss the book before its release

Reviews
Ifmagazine.com - Review of this book
Shadowcat.name - Review of this book

2006 novels
Books based on Buffy the Vampire Slayer